The 1907 VPI football team represented Virginia Agricultural and Mechanical College and Polytechnic Institute in the 1907 college football season. The team was led by their head coach Bob Williams and finished with a record of seven wins and two losses (7–2).

Schedule

Players
The following players were members of the 1907 football team according to the roster published in the 1908 edition of The Bugle, the Virginia Tech yearbook.

References

VPI
Virginia Tech Hokies football seasons
VPI football